This is a list of episodes for the eleventh and final season (1996–97) of the television series Married... with Children.

Fox moved the show's time slot several times throughout the course of the season, which cost the show ratings. Rising production costs and decreasing viewer shares led to the show's cancellation on April 17, 1997, after the final taping for Season 11. Due to this decision, there is no official "final" episode of Married... with Children. While "The Desperate Half-Hour"/"How to Marry a Moron" two-parter is considered to be the final episode, "Chicago Shoe Exchange" was the last episode that Fox broadcast (and is often listed as such on channel guides and even on Married...With Children'''s DVD sets.) This was the only season to feature teaser scenes before the opening credits and a few episodes during this season also featured tag scenes just before the closing credits. For this season, the still of Al and Peggy sitting on the couch was dropped from the closing credits, which for this season are shown against a black background and in a separate card format, instead of scrolling. The opening theme was also greatly shortened, dropping the highway scenes taken from National Lampoon's Vacation'', as well as the scene of Al on the couch giving money to Bud, Kelly, Peg, and the dog (now Lucky, as Buck is dead).

Amanda Bearse missed five episodes this season. Ted McGinley also missed one episode.

In May 2022, it was announced an animated revival of the series with the original cast was in the works.

Episodes

References

1996 American television seasons
1997 American television seasons
11